Thomas Rulon Osmond (born October 26, 1947) is a mostly non-performing member of the Osmond family.

Life and career
Osmond was born in Ogden, Utah to Olive May (née Davis; 1925–2004) and George Virl Osmond (1917–2007). The second of nine children, he has one older brother, George Virl Osmond Jr., and seven younger siblings: Alan, Wayne, Merrill, Jay, Donny, Marie and Jimmy. All of his younger siblings have been professional musicians since childhood.

Tom and Virl were both born with severe hearing loss; while Virl has enough hearing to hear and feel a musical beat, Tom is almost completely deaf. Their younger brothers originally conceived the musical group in part to support Tom and Virl in purchasing hearing aids. Tom and Virl eventually learned how to play several instruments and in later years made occasional appearances with their brothers and sister, most notably the Christmas specials during the 1970s and early 1980s. Both brothers became the inspiration for the Children's Miracle Network. Tom has gained some hearing through medical treatment.

Tom and Virl were also the first deaf missionaries from the Church of Jesus Christ of Latter-day Saints.

Tom married Lyn Heslop on January 13, 1972. They had five children together, including one who died as an infant, and divorced in 1989. Tom worked for the United States Postal Service for 28 years before retiring in 2014. He resides with his second wife Carolyn in Ephraim, Utah; they have two children together. Tom also has two stepchildren from Carolyn's previous relationship.

On July 7, 2018, Osmond underwent a quadruple bypass surgery, but had complications and was put on life support for a period of several days before improving.

References

External links
 
 

1947 births
Living people
American Latter Day Saints
Deaf religious workers
People from Ogden, Utah
Osmond family (show business)
American deaf people